Abu ʿAmr ʿAbbad II al-Muʿtadid (died 28 February 1069), a member of the Abbadid dynasty, was  the second independent emir of Seville (reigned 1042–1069) in Al-Andalus. His father, Abu al-Qasim Muhammad ibn Abbad, had established the Taifa of Seville, and Abbad became its emir when Abu al-Qasim died in 1042. He initially had amicable relations with his neighbour Ferdinand I, Count of Castile and King of León, and tolerated the Christian faith in his own lands. Among other acts of friendship, he authorized the transfer of Saint Isidore's relics from Seville to the Basilica of San Isidoro in León.

Al-Muʿtadid expanded his territory by conquering numerous Islamic taifas (independent principalities), including those of Mértola (1044–45), Huelva (1051), Algeciras (1055), Ronda (1065) and Arcos (1069). In 1053, he invited a number of minor Berber princes from the south to his palace in Seville, suffocating them to death by treating them to an open steam bath, having first sealed up all of the openings in the bathhouse. He also fought against the Zirids of Granada and the Aftasids of Badajoz, but with no conclusive results. In 1063, when Ferdinand I appeared with an army on the outskirts of Seville, Al-Muʿtadid was forced to acknowledge his suzerainty and to pay him tribute.

Al-Muʿtadid died in 1069 and was succeeded by his son, al-Mu'tamid ibn Abbad.

References

Sources

Abbadid dynasty
Year of birth unknown
1069 deaths
11th-century rulers in Al-Andalus
11th-century Arabs